Mad Holiday is a 1936 American comedy film directed by George B. Seitz and written by Florence Ryerson and Edgar Allan Woolf. The film stars Edmund Lowe, Elissa Landi, ZaSu Pitts, Ted Healy, Edmund Gwenn and Edgar Kennedy. The film was released on November 13, 1936, by Metro-Goldwyn-Mayer.

Cast 
Edmund Lowe as Philip Trent
Elissa Landi as Peter Dean
ZaSu Pitts as Mrs. Faye Kinney
Ted Healy as Mert Morgan
Edmund Gwenn as Williams
Edgar Kennedy as Donovan
Soo Yong as Li Tai
Walter Kingsford as Ben Kelvin
Herbert Rawlinson as Captain Bromley
Raymond Hatton as Cokey Joe Ferris 
Rafaela Ottiano as Ning
Harlan Briggs as Mr. Bertie Kinney
Gustav von Seyffertitz as Hendrick Van Mier

References

External links 
 

1936 films
American comedy films
1936 comedy films
Metro-Goldwyn-Mayer films
Films directed by George B. Seitz
Films produced by Harry Rapf
American black-and-white films
Films with screenplays by Florence Ryerson
Films with screenplays by Edgar Allan Woolf
1930s English-language films
1930s American films